Chief channel officer (CCO) is a corporate title for the person responsible for all indirect revenue with a partner within an organization. The Channel Chief typically reports to the chief executive officer (CEO) as a corporate officer or to the chief operating officer (COO). The CCO is usually an executive or senior vice president position.

Responsible for the daily management of  day-to-day activities of the corporation. The CCO is one of the highest-ranking members of an organization, monitoring the daily operations of the company, organization, or agency, indirect sales, business and alliances with business partners. 

With primary or shared responsibility for areas such as sales management, product development, distribution channel management, public relations, marketing communications (including advertising and promotions), pricing, market research, customer service, and programs.

C